The MAX phases are layered, hexagonal carbides and nitrides which have the general formula: Mn+1AXn, (MAX) where n = 1 to 4, and M is an early transition metal, A is an A-group (mostly IIIA and IVA, or groups 13 and 14) element and X is either carbon and/or nitrogen. The layered structure consists of edge-sharing, distorted XM6 octahedra interleaved by single planar layers of the A-group element.

History 

In the 1960s, H. Nowotny and co-workers discovered a large family of ternary, layered carbides and nitrides, which they called the 'H' phases, now known as the '211' MAX phases (i.e. n = 1), and several '312' MAX phases. Subsequent work extended to '312' phases such as Ti3SiC2 and showed it to have unusual mechanical properties. In 1996, Barsoum and El-Raghy synthesized for the first time fully dense and phase pure Ti3SiC2 and revealed, by characterization, that it possesses a distinct combination of some of the best properties of metals and engineering ceramics. In 1999 they also synthesized Ti4AlN3 (i.e. a '413' MAX phase) and realized that they were dealing with a much larger family of solids that all behaved similarly.
In 2020, Mo4VAlC4 (i.e. a '514' MAX phase) was published, the first major expansion of the definition of the family in over twenty years.  Since 1996, when the first "modern" paper was published on the subject, tremendous progress has been made in understanding the properties of these phases. Since 2006 research has focused on the fabrication, characterization and implementation of composites including MAX phase materials. Such systems, including aluminium-MAX phase composites, have the ability to further improve ductility and toughness over pure MAX phase material.

Synthesis 

The synthesis of ternary MAX phase compounds and composites has been realized by different methods, including combustion synthesis, chemical vapor deposition, physical vapor deposition at different temperatures and flux rates, arc melting, hot isostatic pressing, self-propagating high-temperature synthesis (SHS), reactive sintering, spark plasma sintering, mechanical alloying and reaction in molten salt. An element replacement method in molten salts is developed to obtain series of Mn+1ZnXn and Mn+1CuXn MAX phases.

Properties
These carbides and nitrides possess an unusual combination of chemical, physical, electrical, and mechanical properties, exhibiting both metallic and ceramic characteristics under various conditions. These include high electrical and thermal conductivity, thermal shock resistance, damage tolerance, machinability, high elastic stiffness, and low thermal expansion coefficients. Some MAX phases are also highly resistant to chemical attack (e.g. Ti3SiC2) and high-temperature oxidation in air (Ti2AlC, Cr2AlC, and Ti3AlC2). They are useful in technologies involving high efficiency engines, damage tolerant thermal systems, increasing fatigue resistance, and retention of rigidity at high temperatures. These properties can be related to the electronic structure and chemical bonding in the MAX phases. It can be described as periodic alteration of high and low electron density regions. This allows for design of other nanolaminates based on the electronic structure similarities, such as Mo2BC and PdFe3N.

Electrical

The MAX phases are electrically and thermally conductive due to the metallic-like nature of their bonding.  Most of the MAX phases are better electric and thermal conductors than Ti. This is also related to the electronic structure.

Physical

While MAX phases are stiff, they can be machined as easily as some metals.  They can all be machined manually using a hacksaw, despite the fact that some of them are three times as stiff as titanium metal, with the same density as titanium.   They can also be polished to a metallic luster because of their excellent electrical conductivity.  They are not susceptible to thermal shock and are exceptionally damage tolerant. Some, such as Ti2AlC and Cr2AlC, are oxidation and corrosion resistant.
Polycrystalline Ti3SiC2 has zero thermopower, a feature which is correlated to their anisotropic electronic structure.

Mechanical

The MAX phases as a class are generally stiff, lightweight, and plastic at high temperatures. Due to the layered atomic structure of these compounds, some, like Ti3SiC2 and Ti2AlC, are also creep and fatigue  resistant, and maintain their strengths to high temperatures.  
They exhibit unique deformation characterized by basal slip (evidences of out-of-basal plane a-dislocations and dislocation cross-slips were recently reported in MAX phase deformed at high temperature and Frank partial c-dislocations induced by Cu-matrix diffusion were also reported), a combination of kink and shear band deformation, and delaminations of individual grains. During mechanical testing, it has been found that polycrystalline Ti3SiC2 cylinders can be repeatedly compressed at room temperature, up to stresses of 1 GPa, and fully recover upon the removal of the load while dissipating 25% of the energy.  It was by characterizing these unique mechanical properties of the MAX phases that kinking non-linear solids were discovered. The micromechanism supposed to be responsible for these properties is the incipient kink band (IKB). However no direct evidence of these IKBs has been yet obtained, thus leaving the door open to other mechanisms that are less assumption-hungry. Indeed, a recent study demonstrates that the reversible hysteretic loops when cycling MAX polycrystals can be as well explained by the complex response of the very anisotropic lamellar microstructure.

Potential applications

 Tough, machinable, thermal shock-resistant refractories
 High-temperature heating elements
 Coatings for electrical contacts
 Neutron irradiation resistant parts for nuclear applications 
Precursor for the synthesis of carbide-derived carbon
 Precursor for the synthesis of MXenes, a family of two-dimensional transition metal carbides, nitrides, and carbonitrides

References 

Carbides
Nitrides
Ceramic materials